The 2002 Stanford Cardinal baseball team represented Stanford University in the 2002 NCAA Division I baseball season. The Cardinal played their home games at Sunken Diamond. The team was coached by Mark Marquess in his 26th year at Stanford.

The Cardinal won the Palo Alto Regional and the Palo Alto Super Regional to advanced to the College World Series, where they were defeated by the Texas Longhorns.

Roster

Schedule 

! style="" | Regular Season
|- valign="top" 

|- align="center" bgcolor="#ccffcc
| 1 || February 1 ||  || Sunken Diamond • Stanford, California || 7–4 || 1–0 || –
|- align="center" bgcolor="#ccffcc"
| 2 || February 2 || Cal State Fullerton || Sunken Diamond • Stanford, California || 17–1 || 2–0 || –
|- align="center" bgcolor="#ffcccc"
| 3 || February 3 || Cal State Fullerton || Sunken Diamond • Stanford, California || 13–7 || 2–1 || –
|- align="center" bgcolor="#ccffcc
| 4 || February 8 || at  || Dick Howser Stadium • Tallahassee, Florida || 9–3 || 3–1 || –
|- align="center" bgcolor="#ccffcc"
| 5 || February 9 || at Florida State || Dick Howser Stadium• Tallahassee, Florida || 15–11 || 4–1 || –
|- align="center" bgcolor="#ffcccc"
| 6 || February 10 || at Florida State || Dick Howser Stadium • Tallahassee, Florida || 6–7 || 4–2 || –
|- align="center" bgcolor="#ccffcc"
| 7 || February 12 ||  || Sunken Diamond • Stanford, California || 8–1 || 5–2 || –
|- align="center" bgcolor="#ccffcc"
| 8 || February 15 || at  || Pete Beiden Field at Bob Bennett Stadium • Fresno, California || 6–2 || 6–2 || –
|- align="center" bgcolor="#ffcccc"
| 9 || February 16 || at Fresno State || Pete Beiden Field at Bob Bennett Stadiumd • Fresno, California || 5–7 || 6–3 || –
|- align="center" bgcolor="#ccffcc"
| 10 || February 19 || at Fresno State || Pete Beiden Field at Bob Bennett Stadium • Fresno, California || 8–3 || 7–3 || –
|- align="center" bgcolor="#ccffcc"
| 11 || February 22 ||  || Stephen Schott Stadium • Santa Clara, California || 5–4 || 8–3 || –
|- align="center" bgcolor="#ffcccc"
| 12 || February 23 || at Santa Clara || Stephen Schott Stadium • Santa Clara, California || 9–13 || 8–4 || –
|- align="center" bgcolor="#ccffcc"
| 13 || February 24 || Santa Clara || Sunken Diamond • Stanford, California || 8–7 || 9–4 || –
|-

|- align="center" bgcolor="#ccffcc"
| 14 || March 1 ||  || Sunken Diamond • Stanford, California || 8–6 || 10–4 || –
|- align="center" bgcolor="#ccffcc"
| 15 || March 2 || Cal Poly || Sunken Diamond • Stanford, California || 18–5 || 11–4 || –
|- align="center" bgcolor="#ccffcc"
| 16 || March 3 || Cal Poly || Sunken Diamond • Stanford, California || 11–3 || 12–4 || –
|- align="center" bgcolor="#ccffcc"
| 17 || March 8 || at  || Evans Diamond • Berkeley, California || 15–4 || 13–4 || –
|- align="center" bgcolor="#ffcccc"
| 18 || March 9 || at California || Evans Diamond • Berkeley, California || 1–2 || 13–5 || –
|- align="center" bgcolor="#ccffcc"
| 19 || March 10 || at California || Evans Diamond • Berkeley, California || 4–2 || 14–5 || –
|- align="center" bgcolor="#ccffcc"
| 20 || March 23 || at  || Dedeaux Field • Los Angeles, California || 9–6 || 15–5 || –
|- align="center" bgcolor="#ccffcc"
| 21 || March 23 || at Southern California || Dedeaux Field • Los Angeles, California || 12–10 || 16–5 || –
|- align="center" bgcolor="#ccffcc"
| 22 || March 24 || at Southern California || Dedeaux Field • Los Angeles, California || 5–4 || 17–5 || –
|- align="center" bgcolor="#ccffcc"
| 23 || March 28 || Texas || Sunken Diamond • Stanford, California || 7–6 || 18–5 || –
|- align="center" bgcolor="#ffcccc"
| 24 || March 29 || Texas || Sunken Diamond • Stanford, California || 0–2 || 18–6 || –
|- align="center" bgcolor="#ccffcc"
| 25 || March 30 || Texas || Sunken Diamond • Stanford, California || 7–2 || 19–6 || –
|-

|- align="center" bgcolor="#ccffcc"
| 26 || April 2 ||  || Sunken Diamond • Stanford, California || 4–1 || 20–6 || –
|- align="center" bgcolor="#ccffcc"
| 27 || April 5 || at Arizona || Jerry Kindall Field at Frank Sancet Stadium • Tucson, Arizona || 5–4 || 21–6 || 1–0
|- align="center" bgcolor="#ccffcc"
| 28 || April 6 || at Arizona || Jerry Kindall Field at Frank Sancet Stadium • Tucson, Arizona || 19–1 || 22–6 || 2–0
|- align="center" bgcolor="#ffcccc"
| 29 || April 7 || at Arizona || Jerry Kindall Field at Frank Sancet Stadium • Tucson, Arizona || 13–15 || 22–7 || 3–0
|- align="center" bgcolor="#ccffcc"
| 30 || April 9 ||  || Sunken Diamond • Stanford, California || 5–4 || 23–7 || 3–0
|- align="center" bgcolor="#ccffcc"
| 31 || April 12 || Southern California || Sunken Diamond • Stanford, California || 6–5 || 24–7 || 4–0
|- align="center" bgcolor="#ffcccc"
| 32 || April 13 || Southern California || Sunken Diamond • Stanford, California || 11–16 || 24–8 || 4–1
|- align="center" bgcolor="#ccffcc"
| 33 || April 14 || Southern California || Sunken Diamond • Stanford, California || 15–4 || 25–8 || 5–1
|- align="center" bgcolor="#ccffcc"
| 34 || April 16 ||  || Sunken Diamond • Stanford, California || 19–2 || 26–8 || 5–1
|- align="center" bgcolor="#ffcccc"
| 35 || April 19 || at  || Husky Ballpark • Seattle, Washington || 1–3 || 26–9 || 5–2
|- align="center" bgcolor="#ccffcc"
| 36 || April 20 || at Washington || Husky Ballpark • Seattle, Washington || 9–4 || 27–9 || 6–2
|- align="center" bgcolor="#ffcccc"
| 37 || April 21 || at Washington || Husky Ballpark • Seattle, Washington || 3–4 || 27–10 || 6–3
|- align="center" bgcolor="#ccffcc"
| 38 || April 24 ||  || Sunken Diamond • Stanford, California || 6–5 || 28–10 || 7–3
|- align="center" bgcolor="#ffcccc"
| 39 || April 26 ||  || Goss Stadium at Coleman Field • Corvallis, Oregon || 1–3 || 28–11 || 7–4
|- align="center" bgcolor="#ffcccc"
| 40 || April 27 || Oregon State || Goss Stadium at Coleman Field • Corvallis, Oregon || 3–4 || 28–12 || 7–5
|- align="center" bgcolor="#ccffcc"
| 41 || April 28 || Oregon State || Goss Stadium at Coleman Field • Corvallis, Oregon || 13–0 || 29–12 || 8–5
|-

|- align="center" bgcolor="#ffcccc"
| 42 || May 1 || at San Jose State || San Jose Municipal Stadium • San Jose, California || 0–12 || 29–13 || 8–5
|- align="center" bgcolor="#ccffcc"
| 43 || May 3 || California || Sunken Diamond • Stanford, California || 8–4 || 30–13 || 9–5
|- align="center" bgcolor="#ccffcc"
| 44 || May 4 || California || Sunken Diamond • Stanford, California || 13–6 || 31–13 || 10–5
|- align="center" bgcolor="#ccffcc"
| 45 || May 5 || California || Sunken Diamond • Stanford, California || 8–5 || 32–13 || 11–5
|- align="center" bgcolor="#ccffcc"
| 46 || May 7 || at Santa Clara || Stephen Schott Stadium • Santa Clara, California || 13–2 || 33–13 || 11–5
|- align="center" bgcolor="#ccffcc"
| 47 || May 10 ||  || Sunken Diamond • Stanford, California || 13–2 || 34–13 || 12–5
|- align="center" bgcolor="#ffcccc"
| 48 || May 11 || Arizona State || Sunken Diamond • Stanford, California || 2–10 || 34–14 || 12–6
|- align="center" bgcolor="#ccffcc"
| 49 || May 12 || Arizona State || Sunken Diamond • Stanford, California || 3–1 || 35–14 || 13–6
|- align="center" bgcolor="#ffcccc"
| 50 || May 14 || at  || William Peccole Park • Reno, Nevada || 12–13 || 35–15 || 13–6
|- align="center" bgcolor="#ccffcc"
| 51 || May 17 || at  || Jackie Robinson Stadium • Los Angeles, California || 11–0 || 36–15 || 14–6
|- align="center" bgcolor="#ffcccc"
| 52 || May 18 || at UCLA || Jackie Robinson Stadium • Los Angeles, California || 4–9 || 36–16 || 14–7
|- align="center" bgcolor="#ccffcc"
| 53 || May 19 || at UCLA || Jackie Robinson Stadium • Los Angeles, California || 17–4 || 37–16 || 15–7
|- align="center" bgcolor="#ccffcc"
| 54 || May 24 ||  || Sunken Diamond • Stanford, California || 10–0 || 38–16 || 16–7
|- align="center" bgcolor="#ccffcc"
| 55 || May 25 || Washington State || Sunken Diamond • Stanford, California || 11–3 || 39–16 || 17–7
|- align="center" bgcolor="#ccffcc"
| 56 || May 26 || Washington State || Sunken Diamond • Stanford, California || 8–2 || 40–16 || 18–7
|-

|-
|-
! style="" | Postseason
|- valign="top"

|- align="center" bgcolor="#ccffcc"
| 57 || May 31 || Cal State Fullerton || Sunken Diamond • Stanford, California || 3–2 || 41–16 || 18–7
|- align="center" bgcolor="#ccffcc"
| 58 || June 1 ||  || Sunken Diamond • Stanford, California || 5–4 || 42–16 || 18–7
|- align="center" bgcolor="#ccffcc"
| 59 || June 2 || Long Beach State || Sunken Diamond • Stanford, California || 8–4 || 43–16 || 18–7
|-

|- align="center" bgcolor="#ccffcc"
| 60 || June 7 || Southern California || Sunken Diamond • Stanford, California || 4–2 || 44–16 || 18–7
|- align="center" bgcolor="#ccffcc"
| 61 || June 8 || Southern California || Sunken Diamond • Stanford, California || 5–3 || 45–16 || 18–7
|-

|- align="center" bgcolor="#ccffcc"
| 62 || June 15 || vs Notre Dame || Johnny Rosenblatt Stadium • Omaha, Nebraska || 4–3 || 46–16 || 18–7
|- align="center" bgcolor="#ffcccc"
| 63 || June 17 || vs Texas || Johnny Rosenblatt Stadium • Omaha, Nebraska || 7–8 || 46–17 || 18–7
|- align="center" bgcolor="#ccffcc"
| 64 || June 18 || vs Notre Dame || Johnny Rosenblatt Stadium • Omaha, Nebraska || 5–3 || 47–17 || 18–7
|- align="center" bgcolor="#ffcccc"
| 65 || June 20 || vs Texas || Johnny Rosenblatt Stadium • Omaha, Nebraska || 5–6 || 47–18 || 18–7
|-

Awards and honors 
Jason Cooper
 All-Pac-10 Conference

Sam Fuld
 All-Pac-10 Conference
 First Team All-American Baseball America
 Third Team All-American Collegiate Baseball
 Third Team All-American National Collegiate Baseball Writers Association
 College World Series All-Tournament Team

Ryan Garko
 All-Pac-10 Conference

Jeremy Guthrie
 Pac-10 Conference Pitcher of the Year
 Honorable Mention All-Pac-10 Conference
 First Team All-American Baseball America
 First Team All-American Collegiate Baseball
 Second Team All-American National Collegiate Baseball Writers Association

Chris O'Riordan
 All-Pac-10 Conference

Carlos Quentin
 All-Pac-10 Conference
 Third Team All-American National Collegiate Baseball Writers Association

References 

Stanford Cardinal baseball seasons
Stanford Cardinal baseball
College World Series seasons
Stanford